The snowy-throated kingbird (Tyrannus niveigularis) is a species of bird in the family Tyrannidae.
It is found in Colombia, Ecuador, and Peru.
Its natural habitats are subtropical or tropical moist lowland forests and subtropical or tropical dry shrubland.

References

snowy-throated kingbird
Birds of Ecuador
Birds of Peru
Birds of the Tumbes-Chocó-Magdalena
snowy-throated kingbird
snowy-throated kingbird
Taxonomy articles created by Polbot